Peter Donald Beauchamp Hitchener,  (born 21 February 1946) is an Australian television presenter. He has been the chief news presenter for GTV-9 of their flagship bulletin Nine News Melbourne since 1998, and prior to that was the weekend presenter.

Career
Originally from Texas in rural Queensland, Hitchener began his media career in 1965 at the Brisbane radio station 4BH where he wrote, edited and presented news bulletins. Hitchener then moved on to ABC Brisbane where he undertook roles as a television news and radio presenter. Still at the ABC, he moved to Sydney in 1973 where he was a relief presenter on the evening news for James Dibble.

Hitchener moved to the Nine Network after one year at ABC Sydney, presenting National Nine News first in Sydney and then in Melbourne as the co-anchor of News Centre Nine, with Brian Henderson co-anchoring in Sydney. In 1977, Hitchener began hosting the breakfast show on 3AW before moving to 3AK in 1979. At about this time, Hitchener also became chief weekend news presenter and understudy to chief weeknight news presenter Brian Naylor. In 1985, Hitchener resigned from 3AK.

When Brian Naylor retired in 1998, Hitchener took over as presenter of Nine News Melbourne on weeknights. In 2008 Hitchener celebrated 10 years as the weeknight news presenter.

In January 2013, the Nine Network celebrated Hitchener's 40-year career with the network at a gala dinner where many speakers paid tribute to his work in news and the community.
In July 2014, it was announced Hitchener had signed a new contract to remain presenter of Nine News, believed to be for five years.

On 29 March 2021, Hitchener was reading the news bulletin when he suddenly fell ill and was unable to read the teleprompter, causing him to go home mid-broadcast. Hitchener was subsequently revealed to have been suffering a migraine, and was replaced by Alicia Loxley for the following night's bulletin.

In December 2021, it was announced that Hitchener would scale back to 4 days a week from January 2022 presenting from Monday to Thursday with Alicia Loxley presenting on Friday.

In February 2022, Hitchener was announced as a Moomba Monarch alongside Fifi Box.

Charity and community work
In 1998, Hitchener became the patron and active supporter of Able Australia (formerly the Deaf Blind Society of Victoria), an organisation supporting people with multiple disabilities. Since 2011, he has been the patron of Dogs Victoria, an organisation representing breeders and owners of pure bred dogs in Victoria. He is also an Ambassador for the Lort Smith Animal Hospital. In addition he is a regular supporter and guest speaker for many other charity and community events in Melbourne.

Honours 
Hitchener was awarded the Medal of the Order of Australia (OAM) in the 2017 Australia Day Honours list "for services to the broadcast media and to the community".

Personal life
For a short time, Hitchener lived in Eltham during the 1970s.

In April 2008, in a Herald Sun article regarding his 10 years as chief news presenter of Nine News Melbourne, Hitchener acknowledged he is gay. Online commentators criticised the circumstances of Hitchener's personal revelations, saying that he was "pushed" into discussing his private life. Hitchener's spokesperson denied this.

Hitchener supports the St Kilda Football Club in the Australian Football League and is #1 Member at the VFL Sandringham Football Club.

Peter married long-time friend and partner Kodei Mulcahy (Hitchener) in April 2019, confirming speculation that had been circulating in Melbourne for 2 years. The pair divorced in November 2022 and are not on talking terms, according to the Herald-Sun.

See also
 List of Australian TV news presenters year by year

References

External links
Official website
Ninemsn profile of Hitchener

Television personalities from Melbourne
ABC News (Australia) presenters
Nine News presenters
Living people
People from the Darling Downs
Recipients of the Medal of the Order of Australia
1946 births